Glenview is a rural locality in the Sunshine Coast Region, Queensland, Australia.

Geography
Part of the western boundary is marked by the Mooloolah River which flows eastwards across Glenview towards the coast. The Bruce Highway forms the eastern boundary, and the Steve Irwin Way (State Route 6) passes from south to east, where it intersects with and crosses the Bruce Highway to become Caloundra Road.

Glenview has the following mountains:

 Meridan Hill 
 Mount Sippy

History
Mooloolah Plains Provisional School opened in 1878. In November 1879 it became a half-time school in conjunction with Mooloolah Bridge Provisional School (meaning they shared a single teacher between the two schools). Mooloolah Plains Provisional School closed in late 1881 but reopened in 1883 once again in half-time conjunction with Mooloolah Bridge Provisional School. In July 1888 Mooloolah Plains Provisional School became a full time school. On 1 January 1909 it became Glenview State School.

Heritage listings
Glenview has a number of heritage-listed sites, including:
 Steve Irwin Way: North Coast Roadside Rest Areas
Steve Irwin Way: Mooloolah Cemetery

Education 
Glenview State School is a government primary (Prep-6) school for boys and girls at 6 Leeding Road. In 2018, the school had an enrolment of 225 students with 18 teachers (14 full-time equivalent) and 10 non-teaching staff (7 full-time equivalent).

There are no secondary schools in Glenview. The nearest government secondary schools are Chancellor State College in Sippy Downs to the north-west and Meridan State College in neighbouring Meridan Plains to the east.

Facilities 
The Mooloolah Cemetery is located on Steve Irwin Way in Glenview.

References

External links 
 

Suburbs of the Sunshine Coast Region
Localities in Queensland